Charles Tuller Bishop (January 1, 1924 – July 5, 1993) was an American professional baseball player. He was a starting pitcher in Major League Baseball who played from 1952 through 1955 for the Philadelphia/Kansas City Athletics.

A hard-throwing fireballer, Bishop never was able to fulfill the potential that he showed in the minors. He pitched a no-hitter in the Piedmont League in 1948, and later a one-hit shutout in the 1953 Caribbean Series. Then, following a 2–2 record with  the Athletics in his rookie season, he blanked the Boston Red Sox in his first 1953 start but went 3-14 during the regular season. After that, he bounced around as a starter and reliever.

In a four-season career, Bishop posted a 10–22 record with a 5.33 ERA and 121 strikeouts in 69 pitching appearances, including 37 starts, six complete games, one shutout, three saves and 294.0 innings of work.  He also yielded 307 hits and 168 bases on balls.

External links
Baseball Almanac

Retrosheet
Venezuelan Professional Baseball League statistics

1924 births
1993 deaths
Albany Cardinals players
Baseball players from Atlanta
Columbus Cardinals players
Georgia Tech alumni
Jacksonville Tars players
Jamestown Falcons players
Johnson City Cardinals players
Kansas City Athletics players
Leones del Caracas players
Licoreros de Pampero players
Lynchburg Cardinals players
Major League Baseball pitchers
Navegantes del Magallanes players
American expatriate baseball players in Venezuela
Oakland Oaks (baseball) players
Omaha Cardinals players
Ottawa A's players
Ottawa Giants players
Philadelphia Athletics players
San Diego Padres (minor league) players
Sioux City Soos players
Winston-Salem Cardinals players